This list includes music associations and music organizations from around the world. 

 Academy of Country Music (ACM)
 Alliance of Artists and Recording Companies (AARC)
 American Association of Independent Music (A2IM)
 American Federation of Musicians (AFM)
 American Federation of Television and Radio Artists (AFTRA)
 American Society of Composers, Authors and Publishers (ASCAP)
 Argentine Chamber of Phonograms and Videograms Producers (CAPIF)
 Asosiasi Industri Rekaman Indonesia (ASIRI)
 Associação Fonográfica Portuguesa (AFP)
 Associação de Músicos Artistas e Editoras Independentes (AMAEI)
 Associação Brasileira dos Produtores de Discos (ABPD)
 Association of Independent Music (AIM)
 Australian Recording Industry Association (ARIA)
 Bureau International des Sociétés Gérant les Droits d'Enregistrement et de Reproduction Mécanique (BIEM)
 Billboard Magazine, known for the Billboard Hot 100
 British Phonographic Industry (BPI)
 Broadcast Music Incorporated (BMI)
 Country Music Association (CMA)
 Federation of the Italian Music Industry (FIMI)
 GEMA in Germany
 Gospel Music Association (GMA)
 Hong Kong Recording Industry Alliance (HKRIA)
 Harry Fox Agency 
 Indian Music Industry (IMI)
 International Federation of the Phonographic Industry (IFPI)
 Irish Recorded Music Association (IRMA)
 Latin Academy of Recording Arts & Sciences (LARAS)
 Mechanical-Copyright Protection Society (MCPS)
 Music Canada
 Musicians Benevolent Fund
 Musicians' Union (MU)
 Musicians' Union of Maldives
 National Academy of Recording Arts and Sciences (NARAS)
 National Association of Recording Merchandisers (NARM)
 National Music Publishers Association (NMPA)
 Philippine Association of the Record Industry (PARI)
 PRS for Music (PRSM)
 Recording Artists' Coalition (RAC)
 Recording Industry Association of America (RIAA)
 Recording Industry Association of Japan (RIAJ)
 Recording Industry Association of Korea (RIAK)
 Recording Industry Association (RIAS)
 Recording Industry Association of Malaysia (RIM)
 Recording Industry of South Africa (RISA)
 Recording Industry Foundation in Taiwan (RIT)
 Recorded Music New Zealand (RMNZ)
 Society of European Stage Authors & Composers (SESAC)
 Italian Society of Authors and Publishers (SIAE)
 SoundExchange (SE)
 Soundreef
 Thai Entertainment Content Trade Association (TECA)
 Union of Authors and Performers (ZAI)
Music industry
Music industry associations